Majid Michel (born 22 September 1980) is a Ghanaian actor, model, television personality, evangelist and a humanitarian. He received nominations for Best Actor in a Leading Role at the Africa Movie Academy Awards in 2009, 2010, 2011, 2012, 2014 and 2017. He eventually won the award in 2012 after three previous consecutive nominations. Majid Michel attended Mfantsipim School, along with fellow actor Van Vicker.

Early life
Michel was born in Cantonments, a suburb of the Ghanaian capital Accra. The son of a Lebanese father and a Ghanaian mother, he grew up in Accra with his nine siblings. He attended St. Theresa's Primary School, and later, the Mfantsipim School, the alma mater of Van Vicker and also of former United Nations Secretary-General Kofi Annan. In secondary school, Michel was actively involved in theatre and was a member of the school's Drama Club. As a member of the drama club, he received a Best Actor Award in one of their performances on Emancipation Day in Cape Coast, Ghana.

Career
Michel entered professional acting by auditioning for a modelling agency; a neighbour had introduced him to that agency. He was invited to join the modelling agency, Super Model Agency, on the behest of his next-door neighbour. He starred in the television series Things We Do for Love, acquiring his nickname "Shaker" on the set. His role in Things We Do for Love was to be played by a Lebanese boy, and Michel attributes being given the role due to his Lebanese heritage. In a 2017 interview with Star FM Ghana, Majid explained that he didn't get the role for the first film he auditioned due to poor acting from him, describing his "passion for acting" as what made him to continue to press forward in the film industry.

Things We Do For Love became a success and propelled him into the mainstream. On the strength of his performance in the series, he was cast in his first movie, Divine Love, as the male lead, alongside Jackie Aygemang as the female lead, with Van Vicker in a supporting role. All three used their roles in the movie to debut their movie careers. Divine Love was a huge success, turning Majid Michel, Jackie Agyemang and Van Vicker into household names across Ghana.

In 2008, Michel starred as the lead role in the film Agony of the Christ, which received seven nominations at the Africa Movie Academy Awards in 2009. In October 2017, Majid revealed that he is paid at least $15,000 for a role in a film, he also disclosed that he has earned as much as $35,000 to star in a film. In 2016, Majid explained that despite playing mostly romantic roles in films, he has never had a sexual relationship with an actress. In October 2017, Majid explained on a radio interview that due to his religious beliefs, he will no-longer accept to play character that requires him to kiss on set.

Nollywood breakthrough and success
Michel is one of the Ghanaian actors who got into the film industry during the period in which Frank Rajah Arase signed a contract with Ghana's Abdul Salam Mumuni of Venus Films. The contract basically involved introducing Ghanaian actors into the mainstream Nollywood film industry and making them have a star power comparable to Nigerian actors. Films produced under this contract featured Michel include: Crime to Christ (2007), Agony of Christ (2008), Heart of Men (2009), The Game (2010) and Who Loves Me? (2010) amongst others.

Michel made his Nigerian Nollywood debut in the 2009 romantic drama, Emerald, playing a leading role alongside Genevieve Nnaji. While Majid's performance was commended, along with his strong on-screen chemistry with Nnaji, the film received largely mixed to negative reviews. However, the 2009 film Silent Scandals brought Majid into prominence in Nigeria; The film received wide positive critical review for its high production values and Michel's performance, along with his strong on-screen chemistry with Genevieve Nnaji. Nollywood Forever Comments: "His [Michel's] intensity is concentrated in his eyes and he uses it well so it is understandable that he always gets roles in which love and women and the seduction of them play a large role". Same year, another film featuring Michel, Guilty Pleasures was released; Guilty Pleasures upon release was met with generally positive reviews, with praise given to Michel's performance as well. He continued this lucrative trend into 2010, where he starred alongside Genevieve Nnaji once more in Bursting Out, a film which got mixed critical reviews.

Michel was quite outspoken in the media when he started off his career in Nigeria; He confessed in an interview that the first time he met Genevieve, "everything stood still"; he was so star struck that he offered to carry her bag and to be her personal assistant. In another interview, he stated that Genevieve Nnaji is the best kisser in the film industry. He also stated in an interview that Genevieve taught him "how to act", and also implied in another interview that Ghana has no film industry. All of these, along with the explicit roles he played in films made him have controversies always trailing him during his early days. In late 2010, it was reported that the actor is taking a break from Nigeria after receiving death threats supposedly from his Nigerian colleagues, who thinks that he is getting too many jobs. During this time, he went back to act in Ghana, where he featured in films such as 4 Play (2010) and its sequel 4 Play Reloaded (2011).

In 2012, he starred in the War film Somewhere in Africa, playing a tyrant. Though the film didn't do well critically, Michel's role delivery got him wide acclaim, and he won an Africa Movie Academy Award for the first time. This launched his career once again in Nigeria where he has since established himself as a star and has been featured in mainstream Nigerian films. In 2014, he co-starred in the all-time blockbuster 30 Days in Atlanta for which he got listed by Nigerian Cinema Exhibition Coalition as one of the highest box office grosser of 2014. Other 2014 films featuring Michel include: Forgetting June, which was met with generally negative reviews. He however featured in Knocking on Heaven's Door and Being Mrs Elliot, both of which had decent performance, commercially and critically.

Filmography

Personal life 
Majid Michel is married and has three children. On 19 November 2015, he revealed that his wife of 10 years was responsible for his success. And he references only God before her. He renewed his marriage vows in the same year.

Majid is a born-again Christian. On 4 October 2016, he was a guest minister at a local church where he shared the word and performed deliverance on people. Speaking to Joy F.M in Ghana, Majid described his new spiritual life as "genuine and inspired from his understanding from the Bible". On 1 April 2017, he explained that his refined relationship with God has cost him some of his friends. He went further to state that his present friends are determined solely through vision from God. In a 2017 sermon celebrating Easter, Majid summarised the whole essence of the cruxification of Christ as being to "overthrow racism, hate, envy, jealousy, pride, war and demonic powers with a simple filled-grace life". In October 2017, Majid stated that he has been used by God to perform miracles on people. On masturbation, Majid described the act as a sin towards God. He went further to state that it was inevitable for one to engage in the act at least once in a lifetime. He also disclosed that he was once a victim in his younger years but encourages youths to desist from it. During a social media debate with Freeze, Majid disagreed with Freeze stance on tithing. Majid argued that tithing was not an old testament doctrine. Rather, he opined that tithe should be given to the church to help the poor.

References

External links 
 
 

Ghanaian people of Lebanese descent
Living people
1980 births
Best Actor Africa Movie Academy Award winners
Ghanaian male film actors
Mfantsipim School alumni
21st-century Ghanaian male actors
Ghanaian Christians
People from Accra
Ghanaian film actors